Brundin is a Swedish surname. Notable people with the surname include:

 Clark L. Brundin (born 1931), Vice-chancellor of the University of Warwick
 Bo Brundin (born 1937), Swedish actor
 Patrik Brundin (born 1961), Swedish neurologist
 Folke Brundin (born 1963), Swedish rower
 Michael Brundin (born 1965), Swedish footballer

Swedish-language surnames